Bruno Simões may refer to:

 Bruno Simões (Brazilian footballer) (born 1988), Brazilian football centre-back
 Bruno Simões (Portuguese footballer) (born 1995), Portuguese football midfielder